The National Pedagogic University ( - UPN) is Mexico's national university for teacher training. The main campus, directly adjacent to the Colegio de México in Mexico City, hosts more than 5,000 students and is the largest of more than 70 UPN campuses nationwide. The university offers both undergraduate (licenciatura) and graduate programs of study.

UPN is in the process of being separated from the Secretaría de Educación Pública and becoming autonomous.

Unidades

Mexico City

Ajusco (flagship)
Centro
Azacapotzalco
Norte
Sur
Oriente
Poniente

Rest of Republic

Acapulco
Aguascalientes
Atizapán de Zaragoza
Autlán
Campeche
Celaya
Chetumal
Chihuahua
Chilpancingo
Ciudad Juárez
Ciudad del Carmen
Ciudad Guzmán
Ciudad Valles
Ciudad Victoria
Coatzacoalcos
Colima
Cuernavaca
Culiacán
Durango
Guadalajara
Guadalupe
Guanajuato
Hermosillo
Iguala
Ixtepec
Jalapa
La Paz
León
Matamoros
Mazatlán
Mérida
Mexicali
Monclova
Monterrey
Morelia
Navojoa
Nogales
Nuevo Laredo
Oaxaca
Orizaba
Pachuca
Parral
Piedras Negras
Poza Rica
Puebla
Querétaro
Reynosa
Saltillo
San Cristóbal Ecatepec
San Luis Potosí
Tampico
Tapachula
Tehuacán
Tepic
Teziutlán
Tijuana
Tlapa
Tlaquepaque
Tlaxcala
Toluca
Torreón
Tuxtepec
Tuxtla Gutiérrez
Uruapan
Veracruz
Villahermosa
Zacatecas
Zamora
Zapopan
Zitácuaro

References

External links

 Official website

Public universities and colleges in Mexico
Educational institutions established in 1978
1978 establishments in Mexico
Universities and colleges in Chiapas